Kevin Alfonso Rubin is an Israeli actor, network host, internet celebrity, and YouTuber.

Biography 
Robin was born in Herzliya and later moved with his family to Kfar Saba. As a child his hobbies included surfing, skateboarding and breakdancing. He had difficulty in school and was diagnosed with ADHD.

Upon being conscripted to the Israel Defense Forces, he joined the spokesman unit. Upon his release from the army, he began studying acting at Technique, an Israeli acting school. During this period he worked as a surf instructor, and in the process played guest roles in the youth series , "Partners", in the movie , as well as in several commercials. Later he decided to leave his jobs and focus on videos on the web.

At the beginning of 2017, he started posting parody videos on Instagram about situations from everyday life that went viral. In August 2017 he released the song "La Piv Bella" with Idan Telmore. By the end of the year, Rubin's Instagram page had gained about 200,000 followers. His Instagram video "The Unicorn Challenge" was chosen for the Instagram video of the year at the Playcon festival 2017. Rubin also won the 2017 Network Star of the Year award from the Buzzerim website.

In September 2017, together with celebrity , he created the network series "Kevin and Raz - Haim Baharta", which was broadcast on their YouTube channel. As part of the series, six network stars lived in a villa in Caesarea which was called "The Colosseum" (when in the past they were in a penthouse in Netanya and a villa in Even Yehuda) from which they would vlog everyday. Every day a 7-minute long episode was released that presents challenges and attractions for teenagers. The network series is funded by companies that pay for product placement. The series was a success, and each episode has been viewed about 200 thousand views.  television program awarded the series first place for "Network stars of Hebrew year 5778 (2018)".

In June 2018, Rubin participated in the Instagram series "Insta-Babe". In July 2018, Rubin published the song "Hakol charata" (Everything is a sin) together with Sapani and the rapper , which has accumulated approximately 4.7 million views as of February 2022. In August 2018, the  website ranked Rubin and Sapani in 45th place out of 70 youth stars of Israel. In September 2018, Rubin released the song "Lo Holchin Lishon" (We're not going to sleep) together with Sapani, which as of March 2020 has accumulated about 2.4 million views.

In August 2018, Rubin won the "Instagrammer of the Year", "YouTuber of the Year" and "Vlogger of the Year" awards at the Playcon Festival with the web series "Haim Bharta". He was also nominated for the "Breakthrough of the Year 2018" award on the Frogi website.

In January 2019, Rubin together with all the members of "Haim Bacharta" released the group's last vlog, after a year of ongoing activity.

In 2021, Rubin participated in the second season of the show The Masked Singer under the name "Chili" and was the sixth to be eliminated from the competition.

In 2022, together with his mother Karen, he participated in the program: .

Personal life 
Rubin is married to Daniela Kristia, his partner in the network series "Haim Bharta" and they have a son. Rubin's sister is Kim Ben Shimon, who participated in the  reality TV show in 2020.

Discography

Singles 

 2018: "Lo Holchin Lashon" (We're not going to sleep) with Raz Sapani and Vialo
 2019: "Shishi Hafoch" (Freaky Friday) with Shimi Tavori
 2019: "Sim Fam" with Angel Baranes
 2019: "Ninja" with 
 2020:  (Atone) with 
 2021: "Shoponi" with

Filmography

Television

Movies

Musical Theatre

Awards and nominations

References

External links 

Israeli Internet celebrities
Israeli YouTubers
1993 births
Living people